The Avia BH-21, first flown in 1925, was a robust biplane that served an important role in securing Czechoslovak national security during the period between World War I and World War II. As well as being a competent fighter, it was also an accomplished racer, winning several air races in 1925.

Development

The Avia BH-17, a conventional biplane which was the predecessor of the BH-21, was designed by Pavel Beneš and Miroslav Hajn in 1922 as a response to a Czechoslovak Defense Department requirement for a new fighter aircraft. The BH-17 was one of three biplanes amongst the five Avia designs submitted to the Defense Department, along with competing designs from the Letov Kbely and Aero companies. After an extensive review, the BH-17 was chosen and limited production initiated for evaluative purposes. Testing revealed some deficiencies in the BH-17 and a subsequent redesign in 1924 morphed the BH-17 into its final form as the BH-21, which included straightened interplane bracing and allowed for a better field of view for the pilot. A special training version, designated the BH-22, was also created. Both versions utilized Hispano-Suiza V8 engines, the BH-22 the less powerful 180 HP version, the BH-21 the 224 kW (300 hp) Hispano-Suiza 8fb , built under license by Škoda.

The BH-21 was put into production by Avia in 1925, giving one hundred and thirty-nine aircraft for the Czechoslovak Air Force. In June 1925 it was successful in trials staged by the Belgian Air Force. One was built for Belgium by Avia, another thirty-nine were produced under license by the Belgian company, Société Anonyme Belge de Constructions Aéronautiques SABCA and five by the Société d'Etudes Général d'Aviation SEGA.

While in service, the BH-21 saw no combat as it was retired long before the outbreak of World War II. In spite of this, it served as an important stepping stone to the more advanced BH-33 and B-34 types.

There were also two experimental variants: the BH-21J with Jupiter engine (predecessor of BH-33) and a race plane, the BH-21R, with a boosted HS-8Fb engine (298 kW/400 hp). The latter won several national air race competitions in 1925.

Variants
 BH-21 : Single-seat fighter aircraft.
 BH-21J : One BH-21 fitted with a Bristol Jupiter radial piston engine.  Led to the development of the Avia BH-33.
 Bh-21R : Single-seat clipped-wing racing aircraft.

Operators

Belgian Air Force

Czechoslovakian Air Force

Specifications

See also

References

Bibliography

Single-engined tractor aircraft
Biplanes
1920s Czechoslovakian fighter aircraft
BH-21